Motorcycle racing was featured in the Summer Olympic Games programme in 1900 (two events). These events have generally not been classified as official, although the IOC has never decided which events were "Olympic" and which were not.  Events involving motorized transport were later excluded from the Games.

Results
 Race A (1 mile): A. Jordan USA 2:10.0
 Race B (1 mile): E. Holloway USA 1:54.4

See also
1900 Summer Olympics
Motorcycle racing

References

1900 Summer Olympics events
Discontinued sports at the Summer Olympics
Olympics